Scott Mitchell (born 5 June 1970) is an English professional darts player who plays in Professional Darts Corporation tournaments. His most notable achievement was winning the 2015 BDO World Darts Championship.

Darts career

Early career
Before he made his mark in the BDO, Mitchell qualified for the 2007 UK Open, winning his first round match 8–4 against Brian Cathcart before losing out in the second round to 2006 Lakeside World champion Jelle Klaasen.
Mitchell won the England Classic and Swiss Open in 2009 which helped him qualify for the 2010 BDO World Championship as the 14th seed. However, he lost in the first round 3–2 to Northern Ireland's Daryl Gurney. Mitchell retained his Swiss Open title in 2010 and also won the Center Parcs Masters, and qualified for 2011 BDO World Championship as the 15th seed, however he was beaten in the first round 3–0 by Dutch qualifier Jan Dekker.

Mitchell was once again beaten in the first round at Lakeside in 2012, losing to defending champion Martin Adams who won the match 3–0. 
A year later, Mitchell was drawn to play Mark Barilli in a match that guaranteed the winner would reach the second round at the fourth time of asking while the loser would have lost their first four matches at the world championship. After trailing 2–1 and surviving darts in the fourth set that would have seen Barilli throw for the match, Mitchell won 3–2 and was visibly emotional on stage afterwards. In the next round, Mitchell was beaten by Robbie Green 4–1.

2014 – Breakthrough year
Mitchell started 2014 at Lakeside again reaching the second round for the second year running by beating Paul Hogan 3–2 in the first round. He was beaten by second seed James Wilson 4–2.

2014 was hugely successful for Mitchell. He won a host of tournaments including several that were televised on Eurosport namely Top of Ghent in Belgium and the Jersey Open. As well as being part of the England team that won the WDF Europe Cup – where Mitchell won the decisive leg in the final, Mitchell won the prestigious British Open. He also reached the quarter-finals of the Winmau World Masters. After missing four match darts he lost 3–2 to Glen Durrant, who Mitchell beat in the Jersey Open final.

2015 – World Champion
Mitchell's 2014 form saw him enter the world's top four and eventually culminated in him winning the 2015 World Championship. He defeated Tony O'Shea in a sudden death leg after going two sets each and 5–5 in legs. Mitchell then met Geert De Vos from Belgium in the last 16, it was a close fought match in the first four sets being two each with Mitchell taking the fifth set. With the score 2–1 in legs in the sixth set, De Vos missed double 5 to stay alive in the match and Mitchell hit double 20 to edge out De Vos 4–2 and progress through to the last 8. Brian Dawson was Mitchell's opponent in the quarter-finals, "Scotty Dog" winning 5–2. Mitchell beat Jeff Smith 6–0 in the semi-final. In the final Mitchell played three-time winner Martin Adams, and won 7–6 hitting a crucial 158 checkout to break throw in the deciding set. As a result of winning the tournament Mitchell reached number one in the BDO Men's ranking.

PDC
He started competing in the Professional Darts Corporation at the start of 2020. After winning one of the first Challenge Tour events, Mitchell was invited to compete on the Players Championship circuit in 2020.

On 17 February 2021, he won a two-year PDC Tour Card at UK Qualifying School.

Personal life

Mitchell still works full-time on the family farm in rural Dorset and as a freelance landscape gardener. He has been married to Sharon (born 1969) since 1991 and together they have two children, daughter Katie (born 1993) and son Samuel (born 1997).
He is also a fan of speedway team Poole Pirates, and has their logo on his left sleeve. He went to school with Mandi and Paul Panton, the children of well known Barry Panton.

Outside darts

Although Mitchell has played darts competitively from a young age, Scott has had other sporting interests that fitted in with his dart life. He has represented his secondary school in both basketball and football. On reaching 18 years old, Scott applied for his Amateur MotorCycling Association racing licence, and raced motocross competitively for the Christchurch and district A.M.C.A. club from 1988 to 1995. On retiring from motocross, Scott went back to football, playing for his local teams Burley F.C., but mostly for the "Badgers", Bransgore F.C., from 1995 to 2006, winning most-improved player in 2002, and later becoming the team's manager. It was after then that Scott's darts career started to take off, and football had to take a "back seat". He supports his local side, A.F.C. Bournemouth.

World Championship Performances

BDO
 2010: First round (lost to Daryl Gurney 2–3)
 2011: First round (lost to Jan Dekker 0–3)
 2012: First round (lost to Martin Adams 0–3)
 2013: First round (lost to Robbie Green 1–4)
 2014: Second round (lost to James Wilson 2–4)
 2015: Winner (beat Martin Adams 7–6)
 2016: Quarter-finals (lost to Richard Veenstra 3–5)
 2017: Second round (lost to Geert De Vos 2–4)
 2018: Second round (lost to Andy Baetens 2–4)
 2019: Quarter-finals (lost to Jim Williams 3–5)
 2020: Semi-finals (lost to Wayne Warren 3–6)

PDC
 2022: First round (lost to Chris Landman 0–3)

WSDT
 2023: Second round (lost to Robert Thornton 0–3)

Career finals

BDO major finals: 1 (1 title)

Performance timeline

PDC European Tour

References

External links

1970 births
English darts players
Living people
British Darts Organisation players
Professional Darts Corporation former tour card holders
BDO world darts champions
Sportspeople from Bournemouth